Iran competed at the 1952 Summer Olympics in Helsinki, Finland. 22 athletes and represented Iran in the 1952 Olympics.

Competitors

Medal summary

Medal table

Medalists

Results by event

Athletics 

Men

Boxing 

Men

Weightlifting 

Men

Wrestling 

Men's freestyle

References

External links
Official Olympic Reports
International Olympic Committee results database

Nations at the 1952 Summer Olympics
1952
Summer Olympics
Pahlavi Iran